The Ada Independent School District is a school district based in Ada, Oklahoma (United States). It includes seven schools and serves more than 2,600 students.

The district has a jagged eastern border that stretches as far N3930 Road. Its western boundary is west of U.S. Route 377 in the north and S. Oak Avenue in the south.

List of schools

Pre-K
Glenwood Early Childhood Center, houses six educational programs geared toward early childhood (4–5 years old)

Elementary schools
Hayes Grade Center, 1st and 2nd grade
Washington Grade Center, 3rd and 4th grade

Middle schools
Willard Grade Center, 5th and 6th grade
Ada Junior High School, 7th through 9th grade

High schools
Ada High School, 10th through 12th grade
STEPS: Alternative Education Academy

Extracurricular
The high school is home to the Ada Cougars, who have won 19 state football championships (1951-2, 1955–7, 1959, 1962, 1964–5, 1970, 1974, 1980, 1986, 1988, 1991, and 1993–6) - the most in Oklahoma. Ada High School is also the home of Cougar News Network, a high school news program, which appears on Public-access television. Among the many outstanding extracurricular activities and sports programs available to students is the award-winning Ada High School Cougar Marching Band.

See also
List of school districts in Oklahoma

References

External links
 Ada Overview

School districts in Oklahoma
Education in Pontotoc County, Oklahoma
Ada, Oklahoma